Anomodon may refer to:

 Anomodon (mammal), an extinct mammal
 Anomodon (plant), a genus of moss